Salihorsk or Soligorsk is a city in Minsk Region, Belarus. As of 2018 the population was 106,627.

History

The city is one of the country's newest settlements; its construction began in 1958.

In May 1963 Soligorsk gained city status, and by January 1964, the city already had more than 18,000 inhabitants.

Geography

Demography

Sport
Salihorsk is the home city of Shakhtyor Soligorsk football club as well as HC Shakhtyor Soligorsk in the Belarusian Extraliga ice hockey league.

International relations

Twin towns and Sister cities
 Kohtla-Järve, Estonia

References

External links

 Soligorsk official website
 eSoligorsk.by
 Soligorsk News
 Soligorsk

Cities in Belarus
Populated places established in 1958
Socialist planned cities
Cities and towns built in the Soviet Union
Populated places in Minsk Region
Salihorsk District
Dregovichs
Nowogródek Voivodeship (1507–1795)
Slutsky Uyezd